Below is a list of German language exonyms for formerly German places and other places in non-German-speaking areas of the world.  Archaic names are in italics.

Algeria

Belarus

Belgium 

 List of German exonyms for places in Belgium

China

Croatia 

 List of German exonyms for places in Croatia

Cyprus

Czech Republic 

 See List of German names for places in the Czech Republic

As German was an official language during the Empire of Austria, those names are NOT exonyms.

Denmark 

 List of German exonyms for places in Denmark

Djibouti

Egypt

Estonia 

 List of German exonyms for places in Estonia

France

 List of German exonyms for places in France

Georgia

Greece

Hungary 

 List of German exonyms for places in Hungary

India

Israel

Italy

Japan

Latvia 

 List of German exonyms for places in Latvia

Lebanon

Libya

Lithuania

Luxembourg
Note that this list only includes towns whose German name is significantly different from the official (mainly French) form. Towns that differ with predictable spelling/ ending changes shown below are not included.

 ae, c , é, oe, ou, u, v  → ä, k, e, ö, u, ü, w
 -ange, -haff → -ingen, -hof

Moldova

Morocco

Myanmar

Namibia

Netherlands

North Korea

Norway

Papua New Guinea

Poland 

 List of German exonyms for places in Poland

Portugal

Romania

For German exonyms of Romania in Transylvania, see: German exonyms (Transylvania)

Russia 

For German names of towns in Kaliningrad Oblast, see : German exonyms (Kaliningrad Oblast) and List of cities and towns in East Prussia

Serbia 

For German place names in the Vojvodina region, please see: German exonyms (Vojvodina)

Slovakia 

 List of German exonyms for places in Slovakia

Slovenia 

 List of German exonyms for places in Slovenia

South Africa

Spain

Sweden

Switzerland 

 List of German exonyms for places in Switzerland

Syria

Taiwan

Tanzania 
All of the below names are now obsolete. They were formerly used when Tanzania was part of the colony of German East Africa.

Turkey

Ukraine

United Kingdom

See also 

Exonym and endonym
German names for Central European towns
German placename etymology
List of cities and towns in East Prussia
List of English exonyms for German toponyms
List of European exonyms
List of settlements in Kaliningrad Oblast
Names of Germany

References

 
 
German language
Exonyms
 Exonyms
German exonyms